Cheilosia  sahlbergi is a Palearctic hoverfly.

Description
One of the Cheilosia species with bare eyes, black legs and fused antennal pits.  For identification see references.

Distribution and biology
From Fennoscandia south through mountainous parts of Europe to the Alps, the Balkans and the Caucasus and from Britain (Scottish highlands) eastwards through Northern Europe to the Baltic states and on to the Kola peninsula
The habitat is near streams and base-rich flushes in moorlandand montane heath and
non-calcareous subalpine grassland. Flowers visited include Caltha palustris, Potentilla erecta, Ranunculus, Saxifraga.Flies from April to May at lower altitudes and June to July in the alpine zone. The larva has been seen feeding on Polygonum viviparum L.

References

External links
 Images representing Cheilosia sahlbergi

Diptera of Europe
Eristalinae
Insects described in 1894